= Tonari no Motokare-kun =

Japanese manga series

- First tankōbon volume cover

隣の元カレくん
- Genre: Romance
- Manga
- Written by: ago
- Published by: Shueisha
- Imprint: Margaret Comics
- Magazine: Manga Mee
- Original run: April 12, 2024 – present
- Volumes: 7

Tonari no Motokare-kun (隣の元カレくん) is a Japanese manga series written and illustrated by ago. It began serialization on Shueisha's Manga Mee website in April 2024.

== Synopsis ==
Kuroki and Inaba were once high school sweethearts who once broke up and went their separate ways. Now in her 40s, divorced and with a child not in her custody, Kuroki now lives alone in Hokkaido, and spends her time thinking of Inaba. She later finds out that Inaba has moved in next door, which gives her the opportunity to confess her long-held feelings for him despite their break-up.

== Publication ==
Written and illustrated by ago, Tonari no Motokare-kun began serialization on Shueisha's Manga Mee website on April 12, 2024. Its chapters have been compiled into seven tankōbon volumes as of September 2026.

No.	Release date	ISBN
1	June 25, 2025	978-4-08-843164-2
2	June 25, 2025	978-4-08-843165-9
3	October 24, 2025	978-4-08-843208-3
4	January 23, 2026	978-4-08-843227-4
5	April 23, 2026	978-4-08-843258-8
6	June 25, 2026	978-4-08-843276-2
7	September 25, 2026	978-4-08-843303-5
8	November 25, 2026	978-4-08-843323-3

== Reception ==
The series won the second place prize at the 2026 EbookJapan Manga Awards.
